"The Solution" is a song by Yes. It appeared as the closing track of the 1997 album Open Your Eyes. The song itself was never played live, but the closing ambient section opened every show of the album's tour, followed by "Rhythm of Love". It did not see a single issue.

On the album
The work is the last track on the disc. While the recording's index lasts for 23 minutes and 47 seconds, the song itself is only 5:26. The remainder of the composition is consumed by an atmospheric section consisting of a two-minute break and 16:21 of nature sounds and clippings of vocals from each track. As such, it remains the longest studio track in the Yes catalogue, but not the longest studio recording (the title work from Fly From Here, a series of six songs, took this title in 2011, beating it by 2 seconds), despite being essentially two separate compositions.

Alternate issues

Surround sound
When the album was first released, a surround sound edition was available which excluded the ambiance ghost track.

Japanese issue
The Japanese issue of the album also includes this ambiance track. In addition, the radio edit of "Open Your Eyes" appears before this song and after "Somehow, Someday".

Personnel
 Jon Anderson – vocals
 Chris Squire – bass, vocals
 Steve Howe – lead guitars, vocals
 Billy Sherwood – keyboards, guitar, vocals
 Alan White – drums

Notes and references

Yes (band) songs
1997 songs
Songs written by Jon Anderson
Songs written by Chris Squire
Songs written by Steve Howe (musician)
Songs written by Alan White (Yes drummer)